Africofusus is a genus of sea snails, marine gastropod mollusks in the family Fasciolariidae, the spindle snails, the tulip snails and their allies.

Species
Species within the genus Africofusus include:
 Africofusus adamsii (Kobelt, 1880)
 Africofusus africanus (G. B. Sowerby III, 1897)
 Africofusus cinnamomeus (Reeve, 1847)
 Africofusus ocelliferus (Lamarck, 1816)
 Africofusus robustior (G. B. Sowerby II, 1880)
Species brought into synonymy
 Africofusus ocellifer (Lamarck, 1816) accepted as Africofusus ocelliferus (Lamarck, 1816) (incorrect subsequent spelling of specific epithet)

References

 Vermeij G.J. & Snyder M.A. (2018). Proposed genus-level classification of large species of Fusininae (Gastropoda, Fasciolariidae). Basteria. 82(4-6): 57–82.

 
Gastropod genera